Rafael León y García, a.k.a., Rafael de León (c. 1814 – c. 1885), was mayor of Ponce, Puerto Rico, from 1874 to 1875.

Mayoral term
León y García is remembered for various accomplishments during his short stay as Mayor of Ponce. He is remembered for issuing, in 1874, a circular describing the urgent need to conserve Puerto Rico’s forests to avoid ruining the island's agriculture. Only 9700 hectares (23,969 acres) of heavily timbered forest remained in the Luquillo Forest at the time. Closer to his hometown of Ponce, he is also remembered for spearheading, on 20 May 1874, the project that would eventually result in the construction of the Acueducto de Ponce.

See also

 List of Puerto Ricans
 List of mayors of Ponce, Puerto Rico

References

Further reading
 Fay Fowlie de Flores. Ponce, Perla del Sur: Una Bibliográfica Anotada. Second Edition. 1997. Ponce, Puerto Rico: Universidad de Puerto Rico en Ponce. p. 204. Item 1051. 
 Alcalde Rafael Leon y Garcia, Villa de Ponce. Villa de Ponce: Datos estadísticos de 1874. (microfilm) Ponce, Puerto Rico. 1874? (UPR-microfilm).
 Fay Fowlie de Flores. Ponce, Perla del Sur: Una Bibliográfica Anotada. Second Edition. 1997. Ponce, Puerto Rico: Universidad de Puerto Rico en Ponce. p. 335. Item 1667. 
 Villa de Ponce. Presupuesto municipal del ilustre Ayuntamiento de la Villa de Ponce para el año económico de 1874 a 1875. Ponce, Puerto Rico: H. Lara -- Imprenta Nueva, 1874. (Biblioteca del Congreso (Washington, D.C.; Colegio Universitario Tecnológico de Ponce, CUTPO [fotocopia])

1810s births
1880s deaths
Year of birth uncertain
Year of death uncertain
Mayors of Ponce, Puerto Rico